Iwański (feminine Iwańska) is a Polish surname. Notable people include:

 Alicja Iwańska (1918-1996), Polish resistance fighter and academic
 Henryk Iwański (1902-1978), Polish resistance fighter
 Janusz Iwański (born 1956), Polish jazz guitarist
 Maciej Iwański (born 1981), Polish footballer

Polish-language surnames